Prince Albert Carlton is a provincial electoral district (a "riding") for the Legislative Assembly of Saskatchewan, Canada.

The riding was last contested in the 2020 general election, when it returned Saskatchewan Party MLA Joe Hargrave.

One of two provincial constituencies for the city of Prince Albert, the other being Prince Albert Northcote, the riding's northern boundary follows 15th Street (Hwy. 302) from east to west; then curves south along 9th/10th Avenue West to 28th Street, which the boundary follows westward until the city limits.

The riding was created in 1991 out of Prince Albert and Prince Albert-Duck Lake.

History 
Since being created, the riding has returned members of the New Democratic and Saskatchewan Parties. The initial New Democratic Party MLA, Myron Kowalsky, was elected in every general election between 1991 and 2007. After Kowalsky's retirement in 2007, Saskatchewan Party candidate Darryl Hickie won by a thin majority of 62 votes, and the constituency has returned Saskatchewan Party candidates ever since.

Since the 2007 general election, the riding has returned exclusively Saskatchewan Party members, and with large majorities starting in 2011.

Members of the Legislative Assembly

Election results

2020 Saskatchewan general election

2016 Saskatchewan general election

2011 Saskatchewan general election

2007 Saskatchewan general election

2003 Saskatchewan general election

1999 Saskatchewan general election

1995 Saskatchewan general election

1991 Saskatchewan general election

References

External links 
Website of the Legislative Assembly of Saskatchewan
Saskatchewan Archives Board – Saskatchewan Election Results By Electoral Division
Map of Prince Albert Carlton riding as of 2016

Politics of Prince Albert, Saskatchewan
Saskatchewan provincial electoral districts